National Commission for Academic Accreditation and Assessment (NCAAA) is an organ of Saudi Arabia's Education and Training Evaluation Commission that oversees the country's school accreditation facility. It is an autonomous body but directly responsible to the council of higher education.

History 

NCAAA was established in 2004. The NCAAA board of directors is drawn from government, institutions and industry professionals.

Accreditation and quality assurance criteria 

 Mission and Objectives
 Governance and Administration
 Management of Quality Assurance and Improvement
 Learning and Teaching
 Student Administration and support Services
 Learning Resources
 Facilities and Equipments
 Financial Planning and Management
 Faculty and Staff Employment Processes
 Research
 Institutional Relationships with Community

References 

School accreditors
Education in Saudi Arabia
2004 establishments in Saudi Arabia